Shark Girl (2007) is the debut novel by Kelly Bingham. It is a young adult novel in verse that tells the story of the fifteen-year-old Jane Arrowood who goes swimming at a California beach in June, is attacked by a shark and has to have her right arm amputated. The novel is told mostly through blank verse poetry that is interspersed with news articles about Jane’s attack and letters of encouragement she receives from strangers. The story is similar to—but not based upon— the life of professional surfer Bethany Hamilton who had her left arm bitten off by a shark in 2003.

See also
Bethany Hamilton
Soul Surfer (film)

References

External links
The author’s blog (last updated Nov 2009)
The author’s website (broken link)

2007 American novels
Verse novels
American young adult novels
Novels set in California
2007 debut novels